Mihran Jaburyan (born 16 November 1984) is an Armenian Freestyle wrestler. He won the Armenian Championship in 2010 and 2011. Jaburyan competed at the 2012 Summer Olympics in the men's freestyle 55 kg division, reaching the quarter-finals.

References

External links
 

1984 births
Living people
Sportspeople from Yerevan
Armenian male sport wrestlers
Olympic wrestlers of Armenia
Wrestlers at the 2012 Summer Olympics
21st-century Armenian people